Fort Motte (Fort Motte Station) was developed first as Mt. Joseph Plantation; it was commandeered in 1780 by the British and fortified as a temporary military outpost in what is now South Carolina during the American Revolutionary War. It was significant for its military use as a depot for their convoys between Camden and Charleston, which they occupied. Located along the Congaree River, it is roughly 90–95 miles from Charleston by 21st-century roadways. The British had fortified the big house and surrounds, and it became known as Fort Motte, after Rebecca Brewton Motte, who had been occupying it with her family. During the Patriot Siege of Fort Motte, the plantation mansion was set on fire. The British surrendered at this site.

After the war, this site was considered for the capital of the newly formed state of South Carolina, before Columbia was chosen. Today Fort Motte is the name of an unincorporated village at the nearby crossroads of SH 419 and State Road S-9-13.

The former area of the plantation house and grounds is known as the Fort Motte Battlefield Site. Privately owned, it was listed in the National Register of Historic Places in 1972.

History

The Cherokee Path is nearby, long used by indigenous peoples for trading and travel. The first Anglo-European colonists in the area were Scots and English traders, who established trading posts with the Cherokee and other regional Native American tribes. Some posts were fortified as early forts in the colonial period. Amelia Town was established in this area about 1735.

Mt. Joseph Plantation was built in 1767 as an up-country estate by Miles Brewton of Charleston, near the confluence of the Congaree and Wateree rivers. A slave trader, he owned several ships and plantations. He became one of the wealthiest men in the province before he and his family died when lost at sea in 1775 on their way to Philadelphia for him to serve as a delegate at the Second Continental Congress.

His sister Rebecca Brewton Motte (1737-1815) inherited some of his property, including Mt. Joseph. She was widowed in 1780, when her husband Jacob died of illness. After the British appropriated the Miles Brewton House for their headquarters in Charleston, Motte left the city and moved to the relative safety of Mt. Joseph Plantation, 95 miles away.

They were living there when the British took over this property. After the military took over the mansion, the Motte family moved to the overseer's house. The British fortified the big house and its grounds.

A British garrison of regular, Hessian and Provincial forces occupied the plantation, using it as a depot for their convoys running between Camden and Charleston. Waterways were still the key as transportation routes. Mt. Joseph plantation was near a strategic river crossing of the Congaree River, which gave the British access to an important chain of transport from Charleston to points north and west.

By May 1781 the British had constructed wood and earth fortifications at Mt. Joseph: palisades (9' tall) and ramparts (10-11' wide), were faced with a 6' deep ditch in front. 20-30' from the ditch was a row of abatis. Defending the fortified mansion were 184 British regulars, Hessians, and Provincials under the command of Capt. Lt. Donald McPherson. It became known as Fort Motte, because it had been occupied by Rebecca Brewton Motte and her family. She had inherited it from her brother Miles Brewton after he died with his family at sea in 1775, on his way to the Second Continental Congress in Philadelphia.

General Francis "Swamp Fox" Marion and Colonel Henry Lee laid siege to the fortified site. Rebecca Motte became known for giving him arrows from East India which would ignite on impact. His forces shot flaming arrows into the roof to set it on fire and drove the British from it, and shot artillery to prevent soldiers from putting out the fire.  Captain Lt. McPherson surrendered. "The British surrender of the fort alarmed Lord Rawdon and hastened his retreat from Camden to Charleston."

Miles Brewton and his family died at sea in 1775 as he was en route to Philadelphia after being elected to the second Provincial Congress. 

His sister Rebecca Brewton Motte (1737-1815), widowed in 1780 when her husband Jacob died, later inherited her brother's estate and plantations, becoming more wealthy. She and her sister Frances jointly inherited the Miles Brewton House in Charleston. Motte had inherited Fairfield Plantation (Charleston County, South Carolina), which she and her husband had owned, and its more than 240 slaves, as well as their town house in Charleston.

The South Carolina Department of Archives and History, the South Carolina Library, and the University of South Carolina have the earliest extant maps for this area. When cultivation of short-staple cotton became profitable at the turn of the nineteenth century, after the invention of the cotton gin, this upland area was developed for cotton as a commodity crop. The battlefield site is listed on the National Register of Historic Places, considered important because of the military and other history from 1750-1799.

References

External links
"Fort Motte Battle Site, Calhoun County (Address Restricted)", South Carolina Department of Archives and History
The Siege of Fort Motte

Archaeological sites on the National Register of Historic Places in South Carolina
Motte
Buildings and structures in Calhoun County, South Carolina
Motte
Motte
Motte
National Register of Historic Places in Calhoun County, South Carolina
Motte
American Revolution on the National Register of Historic Places